This is a list of diplomatic missions in São Tomé and Príncipe.  At present, the capital city of São Tomé hosts ten embassies. Several other countries accredit ambassadors from other capitals.

Embassies in São Tomé

Non-resident embassies

Resident in Abuja, Nigeria

 
 
 
 
 

 
 

 
 
 
 

 
 
 
 

Resident in Libreville, Gabon

 
 
 
 
 
 

 
 
 

Resident in Lisbon, Portugal

Resident in Luanda, Angola

 
 
 
 
 

 
 

 
 
 
 
 

Resident in Paris, France

 
 

Resident in other cities

 (Yaoundé)
 (Yaoundé) 
 (Pretoria)
 (London)
 (Pretoria)
 (Pretoria)
 (Yaoundé)
 (Nairobi)
 (London)
 (London)
 (New York City)
 (Accra)
 (Dakar)
 (Nairobi)
 (New York City)
 (Kinshasa)
 (Windhoek)
 (Addis Ababa)

See also
 Foreign relations of São Tomé and Príncipe
 List of diplomatic missions of São Tomé and Príncipe
 Visa policy of São Tomé and Príncipe

References

São Tomé and Príncipe
Foreign relations of São Tomé and Príncipe
Diplomatic missions